, real name , was a Japanese professional sumo wrestler from Namioka, Aomori. He was the sport's 59th yokozuna from 1983 to 1986 and won four top division tournament championships. After retirement he established Naruto stable which he ran from 1989 until his death.

Early career
Takanosato played football and judo before turning to sumo. He was from the same area of Japan as Wakanohana Kanji II and the two entered professional sumo together in July 1968, joining Futagoyama stable. Takanosato reached the top makuuchi division in May 1975 but had some indifferent results and fell back to the jūryō division on several occasions. A late developer, he did not reach the san'yaku ranks until 1979, by which time Wakanohana was already a yokozuna. In 1980 he was runner-up in two consecutive tournaments. Nicknamed  because of his brawny physique, he was one of the few wrestlers in his day to use weight training, which is now commonplace in sumo. By 1981 he was a san'yaku regular, and in January 1982 he produced his third runner-up performance, this time at sekiwake, and earned promotion to ōzeki. Following his promotion he announced that he had been suffering from diabetes for many years, and had devised a special diet to keep the illness under control. He won his first top division championship in September 1982 with a perfect 15–0 record. He was runner-up in the March and May 1983 tournaments, and then took his second championship in July. Following this tournament, he was promoted to yokozuna.

Yokozuna
Takanosato was almost thirty one years old when he reached sumo's highest rank, and the 91 tournaments it took him to reach yokozuna from his professional debut is the second slowest in sumo history, behind only Mienoumi. Most yokozuna struggle to perform well in the tournament immediately following their promotion, but Takanosato won it with a perfect record—the first yokozuna to do so since Futabayama in the 1930s. Although his yokozuna career was relatively short, he had a great rivalry with fellow yokozuna Chiyonofuji. In the four tournaments from July 1983 to January 1984, the two wrestlers came into the final day with the same score. This is a unique occurrence in sumo. It was Takanosato who won three out of the four tournament-deciding bouts, and he was one of the few wrestlers to have a winning record against Chiyonofuji. He studied Chiyonofuji's fighting style through watching videotapes of his bouts over and over, and was often able to keep his rival from getting his favoured left hand grip on his mawashi. Takanosato defeated Chiyonofuji eight times in a row from July 1981 to September 1982 and overall emerged victorious from 18 of their 31 encounters.

Takanosato's fourth tournament championship in January 1984 proved to be his last, and thereafter his yokozuna career was disappointing. He missed most of 1985 due to injury, only managing to complete one tournament, but did take part in the three day exhibition tournament held in the United States at Madison Square Garden in June. He announced his retirement in January 1986 at the age of 33.

Retirement from sumo
Takanosato took the name Naruto upon joining the Sumo Association as an oyakata, or elder, and in 1989 opened his own Naruto stable in Matsudo, Chiba, which has produced several top division wrestlers. The first was Rikio in 1996 and he was followed by Wakanosato in 1998, Takanowaka in 1999, Takanotsuru in 2003, Kisenosato in 2004, and Takayasu and Takanoyama in 2011. It was a close-knit stable and Naruto Oyakata did not let his wrestlers go out and train at other stables (degeiko), believing that they did not need outside help. Naruto also worked as a judge of tournament bouts and for NHK as a sumo commentator.

Death
In October 2011 the Sumo Association launched an investigation into allegations made by the news magazine Shūkan Shinchō that Naruto had beaten a former junior member of his stable with a block of wood and had injected Takanoyama with insulin so that the barely 100 kg wrestler would increase his appetite and put on weight.  Both Naruto and Takanoyama were summoned for questioning by chairman Hanaregoma. Just days later, on November 7, 2011, Naruto died of respiratory failure in Fukuoka at the age of 59. At the end of the Kyushu tournament held later the same month, Kisenosato was promoted to ōzeki, something Naruto had always dreamed of seeing.

Fighting style
Takanosato's most common winning kimarite or technique was overwhelmingly yorikiri or force out, which accounted for about 45 percent of his victories at sekitori level. He preferred a migi-yotsu grip (the same as Chiyonofuji), with his left hand outside and right hand inside his opponent's arms. He also regularly won by uwatenage (overarm throw) and tsuridashi (lift out), the latter a technique seldom seen today due to the increasing weight of wrestlers.

Career record

See also
Glossary of sumo terms
List of sumo tournament top division champions
List of sumo tournament top division runners-up
List of sumo tournament second division champions
List of past sumo wrestlers
List of yokozuna

References

External links
 Japan Sumo Association profile

1952 births
2011 deaths
Japanese sumo wrestlers
People from Aomori (city)
Sumo people from Aomori Prefecture
Yokozuna
Deaths from respiratory failure